Positron Records is an independent record label based in Chicago, Illinois. The label was founded in 1998 by Chris Randall, frontman of the industrial band Sister Machine Gun. Positron describes itself as an "anti-label" because they release only a handful of albums and give as much support to each release as they can. The label also features a Creative Commons license for some of its albums, allowing individuals to upload those songs to peer-to-peer websites as well as sample parts of those songs for private or commercial usage.

Artists
 The Atomica Project
 Bizarbies
 Bounte
 Eco-Hed
 Chris Randall (under his own name and also as Micronaut)
 S. Sturgis
 Scanalyzer
 Sister Machine Gun (and spin-off Amish Rake Fight)
 Matt Walker (as Beautiful Assassins and also Impossible Recording Machine)

Label compilations
 Komposi001
 Komposi002
 Komposi003

See also
 List of record labels

External links
 Official site

References

Record labels established in 1998
Industrial record labels
Electronic music record labels
American independent record labels
Companies based in Chicago